The 2015 Kerry Senior Football Championship is the 114th edition of the Kerry GAA's premier club Gaelic football tournament for senior graded teams in County Kerry, Ireland. The tournament consists of 20 teams (11 clubs & 9 divisionals), with the winner going on to represent Kerry in the Munster Senior Club Football Championship, unless they are a divisional club. In this case, the winner of the Kerry Club Football Championship will represent the county. The championship has a back-door format for the first two rounds before proceeding to a knock-out format. Generally, any team to lose two matches will be knocked out of the championship.

Austin Stacks were the defending champions after they defeated Mid Kerry after a replay in the previous years final, however they lost their crown when losing to Dr. Crokes at the Third Round stage.

This was Ardfert's return to the senior grade after claiming the 2014 Kerry Intermediate Football Championship title (They also claimed the 2014 Munster Intermediate Club Football Championship and the 2015 All-Ireland Intermediate Club Football Championship. For this year they didn't supply players to the St. Brendan's divisional side.

On 22 November 2015 South Kerry claimed their 10th S.F.C. title (their first since 2009) when they defeated Killarney Legion 1–13 to 1-12 after extra time and a replay in Fitzgerald Stadium Killarney.
Kerry player Bryan Sheehan raised the Bishop Moynihan Cup for South Kerry and he also claimed the 'Man of the Match' award.

- Ardfert made the straight drop back to the I.F.C. for 2016 after spending just 1 year in the senior grade. For next years S.F.C. they will supply players to the St. Brendan's divisional side once more.
- St. Michael's/Foilmore were also relegated to the Intermediate grade after 7 years in the top flight. For next years S.F.C. they will supply players to the South Kerry divisional side.
- Laune Rangers were demoted to the middle grade after operating as a senior side for 46 years, an era which included 4 Kerry titles, 1 Munster and 1 All-Ireland title.

Format Change
At the start of the year it was proposed by the Kerry County Committee that the number of Club teams in the Senior Championship be reduced from 11 to 9. This means that three clubs will be relegated from the senior grade in 2015 while the 2015 Intermediate champions will not be promoted to the senior grade for 2016.
It was decided that if a club team(s) got to the final of the S.F.C. they would be exempt from the relegation process (Killarney Legion).
It was also decided that the finalists of the Kerry Club Football Championship would be safe from relegation (Dr. Crokes & Dingle).
Hence the number of teams competing in the S.F.C. in 2016 will be 17.

Team Changes

The following teams have changed division since the 2014 championship season.

To S.F.C.
Promoted from 2014 Kerry I.F.C.
 Ardfert  -  (Intermediate Champions)

From S.F.C.
Relegated to 2015 Kerry I.F.C.
 Currow

Participating teams
The teams taking part in the 2015 Kerry Senior Football Championship are:

Results

Round 1 
All 20 clubs enter at this stage. Winners proceed to Round 3 while losers must play in Round 2.

Round 2
10 losers from Round 1 play against each other in this round. The winners of this round proceed to Round 3.

Round 3
The 5 Round 2 winners join the 10 Round 1 winners in this round. One of these clubs receive a bye to the quarter-finals.

Quarter-finals

Semi-finals

Final

Relegation playoff
All club teams who did not reach either the S.F.C. final or the Club Football Championship final take place in the Relegation Playoff.
Hence, Killarney Legion, Dr. Crokes and Dingle are exempt from this process.

Round 1
All 8 clubs enter the Relegation Playoff in Round 1. The 4 winners will earn a place in the 2016 Kerry S.F.C. while the 4 losers proceed to Round 2.

Round 2
The 4 losers from Round 1 play off against each other. The 2 losers will be relegated to the Intermediate grade for 2016. The 2 winners will enter Round 3.

Round 3
The 2 winners from Round 2 enter this round. The winner will earn their place in the 2016 S.F.C. while the loser will be relegated to the I.F.C. for 2016.

Championship statistics

Miscellaneous

 South Kerry win the title for the first time since 2009.
 Killarney Legion  qualify for the final for the first time since 1946.
 The final goes to a replay for the second season in a row.
 Laune Rangers are relegated having been a senior club since 1970

References

External links

Kerry Senior Football Championship
Kerry Senior Football Championship